FourFortyFour South Flower, formerly Citigroup Center, is a  48-story skyscraper at 444 South Flower Street in the Bunker Hill area of downtown Los Angeles, California. When completed in 1981, the tower was the fifth-tallest in the city.

History 
The structure was developed by the Rockefeller Group and designed by Albert C. Martin & Associates. It opened in 1981 as the Wells Fargo Building. Coretrust Capital Partners acquired the property in November 2016 for $336 million. Citigroup exited the building in 2018 and moved to the nearby 1 Cal Plaza building.

Public artwork 
FourFortyFour South Flower is home to one of the largest public art collections in Los Angeles. When the building was constructed, five internationally recognized artists were enlisted to create public works that are represented throughout the gallery.

In addition to the pieces that were commissioned during the building's construction, a new mural by local artist Augustine Kofie was unveiled in spring 2019.

Marc Di Suvero - "Shoshone", 1981.
Michael Heizer - "North, East, South, West", 1967-1981.
Frank Stella - "Long Beach XXIII", 1982.
Robert Rauschenberg - "Fargo Podium", 1982.
Bruce Nauman - "Trench, Shafts, Pit, Tunnel, and Chambers", 1982.
Augustine Kofie - "Two-movement", 2019.

In popular culture
The building was used on a number of occasions as a corporate office location throughout episodes of the 1983-1986 ABC action and crime drama Hardcastle and McCormick.
The building appears in the opening credits and establishing shots of the 1986-1994 NBC television drama L.A. Law as the office building in which the principal characters worked.
In the unreleased 1994 adaptation of the Fantastic Four, the building is used as The Baxter Building.
The building was the setting for the 1996 action thriller Skyscraper, starring Anna Nicole Smith.
The building appears in the Los Angeles level of the video game Tony Hawk's Pro Skater 3.
The building appears in the video game Grand Theft Auto V. It is located in downtown Los Santos (the game's equivalent of Los Angeles), however is renamed the Schlongberg Sachs Center, which is the game's equivalent of The Goldman Sachs Group.
The building appears as the headquarters of CatCo Worldwide Media in Supergirl. In season 5, Obsidian North, a Buenos Aires-based technology company, is revealed to have offices downstairs from CatCo.
The building appears to collapse when the US Bank Tower collapses on top of it in San Andreas .
The building appears as the Los Angeles branch of the CIA in Gotcha!.

Major tenants
 WSP
Bank of China
Equinox
Morgan Stanley
Parker Stanbury, LLP

See also
List of tallest buildings in Los Angeles

References

External links
 FourFortyFour South Flower Official Website
  Citigroup Center at Hines Interests Limited Partnership
 FourFortyFour South Flower Tenant Handbook

Citigroup buildings
Skyscraper office buildings in Los Angeles
Office buildings completed in 1979
Hines Interests Limited Partnership
Bunker Hill, Los Angeles